Manulea predotae is a moth of the family Erebidae. It is found in Portugal and Spain.

References

Moths described in 1927
Lithosiina